Littleworth is the name of two places in Oxfordshire:
Littleworth, South Oxfordshire is a hamlet near Wheatley
Littleworth, Vale of White Horse is a village near Faringdon